Kata Air Transport Flight 007, killed eight crew when a departing Sudanese cargo flight to Turkey turned back and crashed short of the runway.

Early reports indicated that the Ukraine-built An-32 "Cline" had engine problems and turned back to Chișinău International Airport, Moldova. The flight from Vienna had refuelled and was bound for Khartoum, Sudan via Antalya, Turkey with a Moldovan crew of eight.

The aircraft had undergone maintenance at Chișinău. It crashed at 22:15 local time, or 20:15 UTC. Moldovan authorities requested Russian assistance with the black box records. Novosti reported that the crew was four Russians and four Moldovans, but it was later determined that there were four Ukrainian and four Moldovan citizens.

The aircraft was later announced as belonging to Kata Air Transport of Sudan and as having crashed close to the village of Băcioi, Moldova carrying 2.3 tonnes of fuel.

References

External links
 

2008 in Moldova
Aviation accidents and incidents in 2008
Accidents and incidents involving the Antonov An-32
Aviation accidents and incidents in Moldova
April 2008 events in Europe